The 2017 Ladies' National Football League, known for sponsorship reasons as the Lidl Ladies' National Football League, was a ladies' Gaelic football competition that took place from January to May 2017. Cork were the Division 1 champions for the fifth year in a row.

Format

League structure
The 2017 Ladies' National Football League consists of four divisions of eight teams. Each team plays every other team in its division once. Three league points are awarded for a win and one for a draw.

If two teams are level on league points, the tie-break is -
 winners of the head-to-head game are ranked ahead
 if the head-to-head match was a draw, ranking is determined by the score difference (i.e. total scored minus total conceded in all games)
 if the score difference is equal, ranking is determined by the total scored

If three or more teams are level on league points, rankings are determined solely by score difference.

Finals, promotions and relegations
The top four teams in Division 1 contest the Ladies' National Football League semi-finals (first plays fourth and second plays third).

The top four teams in divisions 2, 3 and 4 contest the semi-finals of their respective divisions. The division champions are promoted.

The last-placed teams in divisions 1, 2 and 3 are relegated.

Division 1

Division 1 Table

Monaghan defeated Armagh in a relegation playoff

Division 1 Semi-Finals

Division 1 Final

Division 2

Division 2 Table

Westmeath are ranked ahead of Cavan as they won the head-to-head game between the teams
Laois are ranked ahead of Tyrone as they won the head-to-head game between the teams

Division 2 Semi-Finals

Division 2 Final

Division 3

Division 3 Table

Division 3 Semi-Finals

Division 3 Final

Division 4

Division 4 Table

Division 4 Semi-Finals

Division 4 Final

References

National Football League
Ladies' National Football League seasons